Haleakalā, or the East Maui Volcano, is a massive shield volcano that forms more than 75% of the Hawaiian Island of Maui. The western 25% of the island is formed by another volcano, Mauna Kahalawai, also referred to as the West Maui Mountains.

The surrounding walls are steep and the interior mostly barren-looking with a scattering of volcanic cones.

History 
Early Hawaiians applied the name Haleakalā ("house of the sun") to the general mountain. Haleakalā is also the name of a peak on the southwestern edge of Kaupō Gap. In Hawaiian folklore, the depression (crater) at the summit of Haleakalā was home to the grandmother of the demigod Māui. According to the legend, Māui's grandmother helped him capture the sun and force it to slow its journey across the sky in order to lengthen the day.

Geology
Haleakala has produced numerous eruptions in the last 30,000 years, including in the last 500 years. This volcanic activity has been along two rift zones: the southwest and east. These two rift zones together form an arc that extends from La Perouse Bay on the southwest, through the Haleakalā Crater, and to Hāna to the east. The east rift zone continues under the ocean beyond the east coast of Maui as Haleakalā Ridge, making the combined rift zones one of the longest in the Hawaiian Islands chain. In its prime, Haleakala may have reached a height of 12,000 feet before water and wind erosion, and possibly glaciers, began to carve two large river valleys out of the rim. Eventually, these valleys formed gaps that merged at the volcano summit to create a crater-like basin.

East Maui Volcano was previously thought to have last erupted around 1790, based largely on comparisons of maps made during the voyages of La Perouse and George Vancouver. However, in 1999, the U.S. Geological Survey published in a column that radiocarbon dating indicated that the last eruption was more likely to have taken place sometime between 1480 and 1600.  These last flows from the southwest rift zone of Haleakalā make up the large lava deposits of the Ahihi Kina`u/La Perouse Bay area of South Maui.

Contrary to popular belief, Haleakalā crater is not volcanic in origin, nor can it accurately be called a caldera (which is formed when the summit of a volcano collapses to form a depression). Scientists believe that Haleakalā's crater was formed when the headwalls of two large erosional valleys merged at the summit of the volcano. These valleys formed the two large gaps — Koolau on the north side and Kaupō on the south — on either side of the depression.

Macdonald, Abbott, & Peterson state it this way:

Haleakalā is far smaller than many volcanic craters (calderas); there is an excellent chance that it is not extinct, but only dormant; and strictly speaking it is not of volcanic origin, beyond the fact that it exists in a volcanic mountain.

Volcanic hazard

On the island of Hawaii, lava-flow hazards are rated on a scale of one through nine with one being the zone of highest hazard and nine being the zone of lowest hazard. For example, the summits and rift zones of Kilauea and Mauna Loa volcanoes are rated Hazard Zone 1.

Using this same scale, preliminary estimates of lava-flow hazard zones on Maui made in 1983 by the U.S. Geological Survey rated the summit and southwest rift zone of Haleakala as Hazard Zone 3. The steep, downslope areas of the Kanaio and Kahikinui ahupuaa and the area north of Hana are rated as Hazard Zone 4. Other areas of Haleakala are rated comparable to the lava-flow hazards of Mauna Kea and Kohala (Hazard Zones 7 through 9).

These high hazard estimates for Haleakala are based on the frequency of its eruptions. Haleakala has erupted three times in approximately the last 900 years. By way of comparison, both Mauna Loa and Kilauea have erupted more than a dozen times each in the last 90 years. Hualalai has an eruption rate comparable to Haleakala. All of Hualalai is rated as Hazard Zone 4. However, the frequency of eruption of a volcano is only one of the criteria on which hazards are based. The other important criterion is the lava flow coverage rate. Using the preliminary dates for Haleakala flows, only  of lava flows have been emplaced in the last 900 years. Thus, Haleakala is a distant fourth in coverage rates.

According to the United States Geological Survey Volcano Warning Scheme for the United States, the Volcano Alert Level for Haleakala  was "normal". A "Normal" status is used to designate typical volcanic activity in a background, non-eruptive phase.

Endangered species

Nēnē 
The nēnē bird is on the endangered species list. The bird was once on all the islands of Hawaii but now it is only on the Island of Hawaii and Kauai. Habitat loss, hunting, and introduction of mammals caused the bird population to dwindle. Since 2010, only 2,000 birds were left. These birds were then kept in captivity to increase the population.

Silversword 

Haleakala silversword is a quintessential plant of Haleakalā since it grows nowhere else on Earth. Climate change has been threatening the population of this plant due to hotter temperatures and lower rainfall. The park service has erected fences to prevent damage from local herbivores and from visitors taking the plants as souvenirs.

Forest birds 
Several species of native forest birds across Hawaiʻi are nearly extinct, including the kiwikiu and 'ākohekohe that are found only in East Maui, whose population decreased by more than 70% in the 21st century. A primary threat is mosquito-borne diseases such as avian malaria. Attempts to relocate kiwikiu to higher elevations were unsuccessful in protecting the population as mosquitos also rose into higher elevation habitats after the 1980s.

The working group Birds, Not Mosquitos joined with the National Park Service and the Hawaii Department of Land and Natural Resources to develop strategies to address the threat. In 2022 the group proposed to attack the mosquito problem using the Incompatible Insect Technique (IIT). IIT has been successfully implemented in other places. The plan was to release naturally occurring Wolbachia bacteria present in the southern house mosquito (SHM). The offspring of infected males do not reproduce. Males were to be released repeatedly. Monitoring to guide the frequency, number, and location of releases was to continue throughout the project.

Modern uses

National Park
The park includes the summit depression, Kipahulu Valley on the southeast, and Oheo Gulch (and pools), extending to the shoreline in the Kipahulu area. From the summit, there are two main trails leading into Haleakalā: Sliding Sands Trail and Halemauu Trail.

This is aggravated by the fact that trails lead downhill from parking areas into the crater. Because of this, hikers are faced with a difficult return ascent after potentially descending 2000 ft or more to the crater floor. Despite this, Haleakalā is popular with tourists and locals alike, who often venture to its summit, or to the visitor center just below the summit, to view the sunrise. There is lodging in the form of a few simple cabins, though no food or gas is available in the park.
To help with preservation efforts, Haleakala National Park started requiring a sunrise reservation to enter Haleakala National Park between the hours of 3:00 AM and 7:00 AM HST.

Astrophysical research

Because of the remarkable clarity, dryness, and stillness of the air, and its elevation (with atmospheric pressure of ), as well as the absence of the lights of major cities, the summit of Haleakalā is one of the most sought-after locations in the world for ground-based telescopes (though to a lesser extent than Mauna Kea on neighboring Hawaii). As a result of the geographic importance of this observational platform, experts come from all over the world to take part in research at "Science City", an astrophysical complex operated by the U.S. Department of Defense, University of Hawaii, Smithsonian Institution, Air Force, Federal Aviation Administration, and others.

Some of the telescopes operated by the US Department of Defense are involved in researching man-made (e.g. spacecraft, monitoring satellites, rockets, and laser technology) rather than celestial objects. The program is in collaboration with defense contractors in the Maui Research and Technology Park in Kihei. The astronomers on Haleakalā are concerned about increasing light pollution as Maui's population grows. Nevertheless, new telescopes are added, such as the Pan-STARRS in 2006.

Transportation

A well traveled Haleakalā Highway, completed in 1935, is a road mainly composed of switchbacks that leads to the peak of Haleakala. The road is open to the public (although parts of it are restricted) and is a well-maintained two-lane highway containing many blind turns and very steep dropoffs. Local animals, including cattle, are often encountered in the roadway. The Park Service charges a vehicle entrance fee of $30 (US). Public transportation does not go through the park, but there are four vehicle based tour companies (Polynesian Adventure Tours, Skyline Eco Adventures, Haleakala EcoTours, and Valley Isle Excursions) that operate tours of the park and trips to the summit.

There are three Sunset and Stargazing tours permitted within Haleakala National Park. Arrive for sunset and stay to look through a telescope after dark. Cycling and horseback riding are other popular ways to explore the park. There are a few tour guides on Maui that pick people up at their hotels, and outfit them with a bicycle to glide down the road from just outside the National Park boundary (starting at 6500 ft altitude). Tour operators used to run bike rides down the entire 27 miles from the summit, but in 2007 the National Park Service suspended all commercial bicycle activity within the park boundaries, following multiple fatal accidents.  Some tour operators now offer a modified version of the service which descends 6,500 feet from outside of the National Park.

Climate
Haleakalā's summit experiences a cold-summer Mediterranean climate (Köppen classification Csc), one of the few locations in the world with this climate type. The Haleakalā Ranger station, at a lower elevation, lies in the subtropical highland (Cfb) climate zone.

See also

List of mountain peaks of the United States
List of volcanoes of the United States
List of mountain peaks of Hawaii
List of Ultras of Oceania
List of Ultras of the United States
Hawaii hotspot
Evolution of Hawaiian volcanoes
Hawaiian–Emperor seamount chain
Haleakalā Wilderness

Notes

References

External links

 Haleakalā Crater Webcam
 Haleakalā National Park
 Geology of Haleakalā
 

Landforms of Maui
Volcanoes of Maui Nui
Mountains of Hawaii
Hotspot volcanoes
Polygenetic shield volcanoes
Shield volcanoes of the United States
Potentially active volcanoes
Haleakalā National Park
Pleistocene shield volcanoes
Pleistocene Oceania
Cenozoic Hawaii
Highest points of United States national parks
Holocene Oceania
Holocene shield volcanoes